Sosnovitsa is a rural locality (a village) and the administrative center of Mityukovskoye Rural Settlement, Vozhegodsky District, Vologda Oblast, Russia. The population was 215 as of 2002.

Geography 
Sosnovitsa is located 61 km southeast of Vozhega (the district's administrative centre) by road. Grishinskaya is the nearest rural locality.

References 

Rural localities in Vozhegodsky District